Apopie Lusamba (born 20 May 1985) is a Congolese handball player. She plays for the club Gagny and on the DR Congo national team. She represented DR Congo at the 2013 World Women's Handball Championship in Serbia, where DR Congo placed 20th.

References

External links 
 

1985 births
Living people
Democratic Republic of the Congo female handball players
Expatriate handball players
Democratic Republic of the Congo expatriates in France
21st-century Democratic Republic of the Congo people